Yannick Goyon (born 22 June 1981) is a retired French professional footballer who played as a defender.

Since making his senior debut with Bourg-Péronnas in the 1999–2000 season, Goyon has played for a number of clubs in the French lower leagues, including Limoges, Orléans, Jura Sud and Besançon. In 2015, during his second spell with the club, he was part of the Bourg-Péronnas side that won promotion to Ligue 2 for the first time in their history.

References
 Yannick Goyon at foot-national.com
 
 

1981 births
Living people
Sportspeople from Mâcon
French footballers
Association football defenders
Football Bourg-en-Bresse Péronnas 01 players
Limoges FC players
US Orléans players
Jura Sud Foot players
Racing Besançon players
Championnat National players
Ligue 2 players
Footballers from Bourgogne-Franche-Comté